The Hietzing Cemetery is a cemetery in Hietzing, the 13th district of Vienna.

Notable burials (selection)
 Alban Berg  (1885–1935), composer
 Jean-Baptiste Clery (1759–1809), valet to King Louis XVI
 Franz Conrad von Hötzendorf (1852–1925), Chief of the Austro-Hungarian General Staff 1906 to 1917
 Heinz Conrads (1913–1986), actor
 Engelbert Dollfuss (1892–1934), Chancellor of Austria
 Gottfried von Einem (1918–1996), composer
 Fanny Elssler (1810–1884), ballerina
 Franz Grillparzer (1791–1872), writer
 Josef Josephi (1852–1920), singer and actor
 Ernst Kirchweger (1898–1965), victim of political violence
 Gustav Klimt (1862–1918), painter
 Viktor Léon (1858–1940), librettist
 Hubert Marischka (1882–1959), operetta tenor, actor, film director and screenwriter
 Koloman Moser (1868–1918), artist and designer
 Sabine Oberhauser (1963–2017), politician
 Rudolf Prack (1905–1981), actor
 Katharina Schratt (1853–1940), Emperor Franz Joseph confidante
 Mitsuko Thekla Maria (1874-1941), Countess of Coudenhove-Kalergi
 Henrietta Treffz (1818–1890), mezzo-soprano and first wife of Johann Strauss II
 Otto Wagner (1841–1918), architect
 Mathilde Wildauer (1820–1878), actress and opera singer

External links
 

Cemeteries in Vienna
Buildings and structures in Hietzing